The list of California Institute of Technology trustees includes notable trustees of the California Institute of Technology. The current chair of the board of trustees is Dr. David Li Lee (PhD '74).

List of current trustees 

The official board of trustees site listed the following trustees.
(The list was dated November 8, 2006, and consulted March 12, 2007.)

(Regular) Trustees 

 Ambassador Barbara M. Barrett
 Brigitte M. Bren, Esq.
 John E. Bryson — former U.S. Secretary of Commerce
Dr. Milton M. Chang — Managing Director, Incubic Venture Capital
 John S. Chen - CEO, Blackberry, Inc.
 Wenchi Chen - President and CEO, VLA Technologies, Inc.
 Dr. Peggy T. Cherng - Co-chairman, Panda Restaurant Group 
  Robert B. Chess — Chairman, Nektar Therapeutics
 David T. Dreier - Chairman, Annenberg-Dreier Commission
 Lounette M. Dyer, Ph.D. - entrepreneur
 Joshua S. Friedman - co-founder, Canyon Partners, LLC
 William T. Gross — chairman and founder, Idealab
 Dr. Narendra K. Gupta - co-founder, Nexus Venture Partners
 Maria D. Hummer-Tuttle - President, Hummer Tuttle Foundation
 Robert T. Jenkins
  G. Bradford Jones - founding partner, Redpoint Ventures
  Peter D. Kaufman - CEO, Glenair, Inc.
  Louise Kirkbride — board member, State of California Contractors State License Board
  Walter G. Kortschak
 Jon B. Kutler — Chairman and CEO, Admiralty Partners, Inc.
 Dr. David Li Lee — Managing General Partner, Clarity Partners, L.P.
 Dr. York Liao — Managing Director, Winbridge Company Ltd.
 Dr. Alexander Lidow — Chief Executive Officer, International Rectifier Corporation
 Dr. Ronald K. Linde — independent investor and chairman of the board, The Ronald and Maxine Linde Foundation
  Andrew N. Liveris - Chairman and CEO, The Dow Chemical Company
 Dr. Shirley M. Malcom — director of Education and Human Resources Programs, American Association for the Advancement of Science
 Deborah D. McWhinney
 Dr. Richard N. Merkin - founder, Heritage Provider Network
Kenneth G. Moore - trustee, Gordon and Betty Moore Foundation
 Dr. Philip M. Neches — consultant and entrepreneur
 Dr. Patrick H. Nettles, Jr. — Executive Chairman, Ciena Corporation
 Peter Norton — president, Norton Family Office
 Ronald L. Olson — senior partner, Munger, Tolles & Olson
  Stephen R. Onderdonk — President and CEO (retired), Econolite Control Products, Inc
 Dr. Thomas F. Rosenbaum - President, California Institute of Technology
 Dr. Stephen A. Ross — Franco Modigliani Professor of Finance and Economics, Massachusetts Institute of Technology; chairman, Compensation Valuation, Inc.
  James F. Rothenberg — President, Capital Research and Management Company
 Dr. Richard H. Scheller - Genentech
  Marc Stern — President, TCW Group, Inc.
  Donald W. Tang
  Kevin M. Tawell
  David W. Thompson - Chairman and CEO, Orbital Sciences Corporation
 Gayle E. Wilson — non-profit consultant
 Dr. Richard A. Wolf

Senior Trustees 

  Gordon M. Binder - Managing Director - Coastview Capital
  Robert C. Bonner
 Lynn A. Booth
 Dr. William H. Davidow - founding partner, Mohr, Davidow Ventures
 Dr. Thomas E. Everhart — President Emeritus, California Institute of Technology
 B. Kipling Hagopian
 Frederick J. Hameetman - Chairman - Cal-American
 Shirley M. Hufstedler — Senior of Counsel, Morrison & Foerster
 Admiral Bobby R. Inman — Professor, Lyndon B. Johnson Centennial Chair in National Policy, LBJ School of Public Affairs, The University of Texas at Austin
  Kent Kresa
 Dr. Ronald K. Linde
  A. Michael Lipper - CEO, Lipper Advisory Services
 Ronald L. Olson
 Stewart A. Resnick - President, Roll Global, LLC
  Nelson C. Rising
  Charles R. Trimble
  Lewis W. Van Amerongen
 Walter L. Weisman
 Dr. Suzanne H. Woolsey

Life Trustees 

 TGeorge L. Argyros
  Stephen D. Bechtel, Jr. — Chairman Emeritus and Director, Bechtel Group, Inc.
 Donald L. Bren — Chairman of the Board, The Irvine Company
  Eli Broad
 Dr. Harold Brown
  Walter Burke
 Dr. Jewel Plummer Cobb — President Emerita, California State University, Fullerton
  Harry M. Conger — Chairman and chief executive officer, emeritus, Homestake Mining Company
  Richard P. Cooley
 Camilla Chandler Frost
 Arthur L. Goldstein
Philip M. Hawley — President, P.M. Hawley, Inc.
 Dr. Gordon E. Moore
 Sidney R. Petersen
 Dr. Simon Ramo — co-founder, TRW Inc.
  Arthur Rock — Principal, Arthur Rock and Company
 Benjamin M. Rosen — Chairman Emeritus, Compaq Computer Corporation
 Richard M. Rosenberg
 Robert J. Schultz — Vice Chairman (retired), General Motors Corporation
 Mary Scranton — non-profit consultant
 Dennis Stanfill — Dennis Stanfill Company
 Dr. Charles H. Townes — professor in the Graduate School, University of California, Berkeley, Department of Physics
 Dr. Virginia V. Weldon

External links
 Caltech Board of Trustees official site

California Institute of Technology trustees